The OM656 is a turbocharged diesel engine produced by Mercedes-Benz since 2017. It was first introduced in the facelift W222 S-Class.

Design 
The OM656 is based on a modular design that is shared with other 4-cylinder and 6-cylinder, petrol and diesel engines. It is the replacement to the previous V6, in order to maintain the cost of production between different engines. The OM656 has dual overhead camshafts with variable valve timing, and uses AdBlue injection and exhaust gas recirculation to reduce emissions. The cylinder walls are coated with arc sprayed steel whose increased porosity aids oil film strength to reduce friction.

Models

OM656 D29T R SCR 
 2017–2020 W222 S 350 d
 2018–2020 C257 CLS 350 d
 2018–2020 W213 E 350 d
2018–present W463 G 350 d
2019–present V167 GLE 350 d
2020–present X167 GLS 350 d
2021–present W223 S 350 d

OM656 D29T SCR 
 2017–2020 W222 S 400 d

 2018–present C257 CLS 400 d 4MATIC

 2018–present W213 E 400 d 4MATIC

2018-present W463 G400 d

2019–present V167 GLE 400 d

2020–present X167 GLS 400 d

2021–present W223 S 400 d 4MATIC

References

External links
OM 656. Most powerful diesel car in Mercedes-Benz history

OM656
Diesel engines by model
Straight-six engines